Ghosts in the Machine is the second album by the Ohio nu metal band Switched. This is a two-disc album, with the first disc featuring 11 tracks that were intended for the band's second release under their previous label, Immortal Records. The quality of these songs are rough, as they were still in the demo phase. The second disc includes 12 tracks in total, 8 demo tracks – 7 of which featured on their debut album Subject to Change and one b-side track "She Blinded Me with Science". The remaining four tracks are live performances.

Track listing
Disc 1:
 "Save Myself" – 3:59
 "Like Suicide" – 3:22
 "Empty Promises" – 3:43
 "Shattered" – 3:25
 "Who Feels" – 3:36
 "I'm Falling" – 3:01
 "Circles" – 3:19
 "Travel On" – 3:17
 "Drowning" – 2:52
 "Into Disaster" – 3:12
 "Memories of You" – 4:00

Disc 2:
 "Spread (New Recording)" – 4:13
 "Inside (Demo)" – 4:16
 "Skins (Demo)" – 3:42
 "Wrong Side (Demo)" – 4:08
 "Anymore (Demo)" – 3:42
 "Darkening Days (Demo)" – 3:41
 "Last Chance (Demo)" – 4:12
 "She Blinded Me with Science (Demo)" – 4:05
 "Anymore" (Live) – 4:23
 "Religion" (Live) – 3:39
 "Ten Dead Fingers" (Live) – 4:58
 "Four Walls" (Live) – 4:48
Note(s):
 Track 1 is a re-recording featuring the then current lineup with Josh Jansen on bass and Angel on drums
 Tracks 2–8 are demo tracks.

Personnel
 Ben Schigel – Vocals
 Bradley Kochmit – Guitars
 Joe Schigel – Guitars
 Corey Lowery – Bass
 Chad Szeliga – Drums

Notes
 Produced by: Ben Schigel.
 Additional production: Tony Gammalo.
 Live Tracks + "Spread" produced by Jason Bieler and mixed by Toby Wright.
 Additional guitar performed by Tony Gammalo.
 Bass on Subject To Change/Disc 2 tracks performed by Tony Gammalo.
 Tracks (Disc 1) 1–11 and (Disc 2) 2–7 recorded at Spider Studios, Cleveland, Ohio.
 Tracks (Disc 2) 9–12 recorded live in Miami, Florida, on July 28, 2001.

References

2006 albums
Switched (band) albums
Corporate Punishment Records albums